Mood music is easy listening music.

Mood music may also refer to:

 Beautiful music
 Exotica
 Light music 
 Lounge music
 Elevator music
 Music provided by Mood Media, Corporation
 Mood Music (play), a 2018 play by Joe Penhall

See also 
 Background music
 Production music